"It Works" is a song written by Mickey Cates and Mark Alan Springer, and recorded by American country music group Alabama.  It was released in January 1996 as the third single from the album In Pictures.  The song reached number 19 on the Billboard Hot Country Singles & Tracks chart.

Music video
A music video was made for this song and was released in early 1996.

Chart performance

References

1996 singles
1995 songs
Alabama (American band) songs
Song recordings produced by Emory Gordy Jr.
RCA Records singles
Songs written by Mark Alan Springer
Songs written by Mickey Cates